Elysian Fields Avenue is a broad, straight avenue in New Orleans named after the Avenue des Champs-Élysées in Paris. The avenue intersects with Interstate 610, Interstate 10, and U.S. Highway 90, Gentilly Boulevard passing by Brother Martin High School. The part between North Claiborne Avenue (Louisiana Highway 39) and Gentilly Boulevard (U.S. Route 90) is Louisiana Highway 3021 (LA 3021); the piece from N. Claiborne Avenue south to St. Claude Avenue carries Louisiana Highway 46 (which turns east on St. Claude Avenue).

For more than half of its route, from the river to Gentilly Boulevard (U.S. Route 90), it is six lanes wide; the remainder north of Gentilly Boulevard is four lanes wide.  Anchoring the lake end and river end (northern and southern termini) respectively are the University of New Orleans and the Esplanade Avenue Wharf.

The location of Elysian Fields Avenue originated in the early 19th century placement of a sawmill canal on the Marigny Plantation, which at that time was just outside New Orleans proper (the present French Quarter).  In 1831 the Pontchartrain Railroad was built from that location straight to Lake Pontchartrain. The railroad carried both goods and passengers.  Among the railroad's steady revenue sources was mail, which was carried from New Orleans to Lake Pontchartain for transfer to Mobile, Alabama-bound ships.  The railroad, which came to be known locally as "Smoky Mary", operated until 1935.  The tracks were removed in the 1950s.

Lakeshore Drive
At the end of Elysian Fields where it meets the lake. Lakeshore Drive runs along the south shore of Lake Pontchartrain. It is a recreational park space along the lake used for sun bathing, running, swimming (Swimming is allowed only by the Seabrook Bridge and you can only swim to a certain point), fishing and crabbing on the seawall steps, and leisurely walks, etc. This space is used mostly by locals and residents of New Orleans.

Public transit routes
Two RTA bus routes operated on Elysian Fields Avenue: one local (est. August 4, 1924; first known as Frenchmen, later, as of January 1957, just Elysian Fields [or Elysian Fields – Pont. Beach/UNO], and later, in January 1989, 55 Elysian Fields), the other an express (est. December 5, 1960, first known as Express 91 – Pontchartrain Beach via Elysian Fields, later 56 Elysian Fields Express).

A Streetcar Named Desire reference

Elysian Fields is the setting for Tennessee Williams' 1947 play "A Streetcar Named Desire". Williams presents the setting as multi-cultural and vibrant with Jazz culture and social life. Blanche Dubois, the tragic heroine of the play, is seen to be "incongruous" to the setting, which is used by Williams' to highlight the cosmopolitan nature of the city and decay of the Old South, which Blanche symbolises.

Geographic coordinates
 – northern terminus at Lake Pontchartrain
 – Gentilly Boulevard
 – Interstate 610
 – Interstate 10
 – southern terminus at Mississippi River

Major intersections

See also
Brother Martin High School

References

External links

La DOTD State, District, and Parish Maps
District 02
Orleans Parish

Streets in New Orleans
3021